"Summer Holiday" is the twelfth and final episode of the British sitcom The Young Ones. It was written by Ben Elton, Rik Mayall, and Lise Mayer, and directed by Paul Jackson and Ed Bye. It was first aired on BBC2 on 19 June 1984.

Plot

The quartet have taken their final exams and are enjoying the summertime, although Vyvyan is bored and begins to want violence and destruction. Rick suggests Botticelli to relieve the boredom, but his playing style proves too tedious and Vyvyan proposes cricket instead. In the living room, Rick is given the role of stumps and Vyvyan is bowler to Mike's batsman. The first shot knocks out Neil as he enters the room; the second involves Vyvyan not releasing the ball and running straight for Rick, clouting him on the head. Mike suggests that Vyvyan obtain The Ashes for winning, which he promptly tries to do by setting Rick on fire. Neil reveals it is his birthday, much to the indifference of the others. The four decide to watch the television, but the channels are all closing down, infuriating Vyvyan who kicks the TV to pieces. Rick then learns of his parents' sudden death from Mike, who thought it unimportant to mention earlier.

Jerzei Balowski arrives to check on the house and its belongings, but on discovering several destroyed items, including the television, Jerzei evicts them all onto the street. The next morning, the four are seen living on the streets as John Otway performs his song "Body Talk", provoking Vyvyan to comment: "I'll bloody well make his body talk in a minute!". The four later receive their exam results from the postman, who has already read the letters and tells Rick that he "came bottom in the whole world", followed by Vyvyan, Mike, and Neil coming top out of the four. Mike then hatches a plan to rob a bank, using water pistols and Vyvyan's Ford Anglia as a getaway vehicle. They mess up their own robbery, but unwittingly take the proceeds from a separate ongoing one, and escape to Vyvyan's car, which he had parked in front of a lamppost. Vyvyan promptly crashes it into the lamppost. Inconsolable at crashing his car, he also reveals that his hamster SPG has died, as he was sleeping on the car's radiator when the car crashed.

With the police sirens in the distance, Rick leaves to find a new getaway vehicle, and returns with an AEC Routemaster double-decker bus, which they drive away to freedom. As they sing songs and plan for their future, Rick suddenly shouts: "Look out, Cliff!", as the bus crashes into a Cliff Richard concert billboard and later immediately plunges over a cliff on the other side. The bus lands at the bottom of a quarry, and there is a pause until the lads remark: "Phew, that was close!", which is followed by the bus exploding into flames as the show comes to an end.

Characters

Mike (Christopher Ryan); Vyvyan (Adrian Edmondson); Rick (Rik Mayall) and Neil (Nigel Planer). The episode also features their landlord Jerzei Balowski (Alexei Sayle) for his only time during the second series, and for the third time in total. No explanation is given for how he survived being locked in Mike's room with man eating lions or reverted from being a homicidal ax-wielding maniac.

A postman is played by Lenny Henry, while Jools Holland and Norman Lovett cameo as bank customers. Stephen Frost also makes an appearance, playing the bank manager. DJ Alan Freeman plays God while sitting at a radio mixing desk, for the second time in the series.

References

External links

1984 British television episodes
British television series finales
Television episodes about theft
The Young Ones episodes
Television shows written by Ben Elton